The Song of Dermot and the Earl is an anonymous Anglo-Norman verse chronicle written in the early 13th century in England. It tells of the arrival of Richard de Clare (Strongbow) in Ireland in 1170 (the "earl" in the title), and of the subsequent arrival of Henry II of England. The poem mentions one Morice Regan, secretary to Dairmaid mac Murchadha, king of Leinster, who was eyewitness to the events and may have provided an account to the author.

The chronicle survives only in a single manuscript which was re-discovered in the 17th century in London. The work bears no title in the manuscript, but has been commonly referred to as The Song of Dermot and the Earl since Goddard Henry Orpen in 1892 published a diplomatic edition under this title. It has also been known as The Conquest of Ireland and The Conquest of Ireland by Henry II; in the most recent edition it was called  La Geste des Engleis en Yrlande ("The Deeds of the English in Ireland").

Lines from The Song of (King) Dermot and the Earl (Strongbow)

This section of the poem has been translated from Anglo-Norman French
by G.H.C. Orpen (Trinity College, Dublin) from the Carew 596 manuscript and covers lines 3129 - 3161 (see Skryne and the Early Normans (1994) by Elizabeth Hickey. p. 31).

See also
Anglo-Norman literature
Hiberno-Norman
Norman Ireland
Diarmait Mac Murchada (Dermot)
Kingdom of Ossory

Editions and translations

 Diplomatic edition
Edition at CELT
PDF scan at archive.org
Anglo-Norman poem on the conquest of Ireland by Henry the Second (1837). Edited by Francisque Xaview Michel. With an introductory essay on the history of the Anglo-Norman conquest of Ireland, by Thomas Wright.

Further reading

References

Anglo-Norman literature
English chronicles
13th-century poems
MacMorrough Kavanagh dynasty